The Paranoá Island (Portuguese: Ilha do Paranoá) is the largest of the three islands of Lake Paranoá in Brasília, Distrito Federal, Brazil. It is approximately 1.54 hectares, is located close to the ML 4 of Lago Norte neighborhood and is declared Lake Paranoá Ecological Reserve. The other two islands are Retiro Island and Clubes Island.

Lake islands of Brazil